Jacques Breuer (born October 20, 1956) is an Austrian screen and voice actor and film director living in Germany. His grandfather was the popular Austrian actor Siegfried Breuer and both his father, Siegfried Breuer jr., and his ten years younger brother, Pascal Breuer, are actors.

Born in Munich, Germany, Breuer graduated from the musical Camerloher-Gymnasium in Freising. His acting debut was in 1975 when he was still attending the Otto Falckenberg School of the Performing Arts when he played in Brecht's Señora Carrar's Rifles at Munich Kammerspiele. Since then he has been freelancing.

Filmography
1975: Derrick - Season 2, Episode 9: "Ein Koffer aus Salzburg"
1976: Everyone Dies Alone
1978: 
1978: Derrick - Season 5, Episode 8: "Solo für Margarete"
1979: Mathias Sandorf, TV miniseries
1980: Derrick - Season 7, Episode 7: "Der Tod sucht Abonnenten"
1981: Derrick - Season 8, Episode 7: "Das sechste Streichholz"
1981: Berlin Tunnel 21
1983: Derrick - Season 10, Episode 4: "Der Täter schickte Blumen"
1984: Egmont, TV film
1984: Don Carlos, TV film
1985: Derrick - Season 12, Episode 6: "Das tödliche Schweigen"
1985: Morenga
1986: The Second Victory
1987: Wallenstein, TV miniseries
1987: The Cry of the Owl, TV film
1988: Finsternis bedeckt die Erde, TV miniseries
1988: Stahlkammer Zürich, TV series
1990: Café Meineid, TV series
1990: 
1991: Derrick - Season 18, Episode 7: "Der Tote spielt fast keine Rolle"
1993: Derrick - Season 20, Episode 8: "Zwei Tage, zwei Nächte"
1994: Derrick - Season 21, Episode 8: "Gesicht hinter der Scheibe"
1995: Liebe, Leben Tod
1997: Derrick - Season 24, Episode 4: "Gesang der Nachtvögel"
1998: Zum Sterben schön
1998: Singles, TV series
1998:  - Season 6, Episode 4: "Dr. Vogt - Freundschaften"
2000: Der Zauber des Rosengartens, TV film
2000: Midsummer Stories
2002: Schlosshotel Orth, TV series
2002: Polizeiruf 110, TV series
2003: Mama und der Millionär, TV film
2003: Das Toscanakarussel, TV film
2003: SOKO Kitzbühel, TV series
2003: Herz ohne Krone (The Uncrowned Heart), TV film
2004: Tramitz & Friends, TV series
2004: Um Himmels Willen, TV series
2005: The Old Fox: Der Filmriss', TV
2005: Siska, TV series
2005: Cash...und ewig rauschen die Gelder, TV film
2006: The Old Fox: Tag der Rache, TV
2006: SOKO 5113: Ein Leben für die Kunst, TV
2006: Vergiss, wenn du lieben willst, TV film
2006: Im Tal der wilden Rosen - Vermächtnis der Liebe, TV film
1978–2001: guest appearances in: Tatort, Siska, The Old Fox, Wolffs Revier, Medicopter 117, Inspector Rex''

External links
 
 Doris Mattes Agency Munich 

1956 births
Living people
Austrian male television actors
Austrian male voice actors
Austrian film directors
20th-century Austrian male actors
21st-century Austrian male actors
Male actors from Munich